Juan Ariel Muñoz Ureta (born November 5, 1946) is a Filipino comedian, actor and TV host.

Biography

Early career
Ureta's first movie was Zoom Zoom Superman a fantasy comedy movie with the former child wonder Niño Muhlach in 1973, followed by his next comedy movie, Si Popeye ATBP Movie was also released the same year. On television, he co-hosted the mid-day variety show Noontime Matinee with Tina Revilla over GMA-7 which was later became, Ariel con Tina over BBC-2 (now ABS-CBN 2). He also hosted Ariel and Co after 6 in the same television network. He also hosted a variety show called Patok na Patok was formerly aired on MBS 4 (now PTV 4) from 1975 to 1977.

Current career
He also hosted a party themed night musical variety program RSVP on Kapuso Network GMA 7 from 1991 to 1995 with co-host Dawn Zulueta. Ureta was also a host of a short-lived comedy game program Go For It on ABC 5 (now TV5) from 1998 to 1999. He is also a former sitcom director of a comedy show Ober Da Bakod, formerly aired on  GMA Network from 1993 to 1997. His comeback movie was Kimmy Dora: Ang Kiyemeng Prequel, with co star fellow comedian and television host Eugene Domingo was released in 2013.

Ureta is a comedic icon in the Philippines during the 60's and the 70's. He has done many Filipino films. This includes Zoom Zoom Superman, Si Popeye at iba pa, Jack en Poy, Kasal, Kasali, Kasalo, Sakal, Sakali, Saklolo, Kimmy Dora and its sequel and Of All The Things.

Ureta is a segment host of the Philippine morning television show, Umagang Kay Ganda and a former co-anchor of DZMM's Todo-Todo Walang Preno with Winnie Cordero until August 28, 2020.

Ureta is a part of Kimmy Dora and its sequel as Luisito Go Dong Hae, Kimmy and Dora's father. The film is a box-office success in the Philippines earning PHP80 million and PHP133,963,009 for the first and second film respectively.

Personal life
Ureta graduated with a degree in architecture at the University of Santo Tomas.

Filmography

Television
Luv Is: Caught in His Arms (GMA Network, 2023) - Don Garpido Ferell 
FPJ's Ang Probinsyano (Kapamilya Channel, 2021) - Prof. Henry Sarmiento
Oh My Dad! (TV5, 2020–2021) - Lolo Moises Balderama
Todo-Todo Walang Preno (TeleRadyo, 2007–2020) - Host
Sana Dalawa Ang Puso (ABS-CBN, 2018) - special participation
Dream Dad (ABS-CBN, 2015) - supporting role
Umagang Kay Ganda (ABS-CBN, 2012–2020) - Host
My Favorite Show (ANC, 2006) - Host 
Miss Earth (ABS-CBN, 2003, 2005 and 2006) - Host
Maynila (GMA Network, 1999) - Various Roles
Go for It! (TV5 "Formerly ABC 5", 1998–1999) - Host
Ober Da Bakod (GMA Network, 1993–1996) - TV director
RSVP (GMA Network, 1993–1995) - Host
Vilma On 7 (GMA Network, 1991) - Co host
Patok Na Patok (PTV 4 "Formerly MBS 4", 1975-1977)
Ariel and Co. After Six (BBC, 1974-1978) - Host
Ariel Con Tina (GMA Network, 1972-1974) - Host
Two For The Road (ABS-CBN, 1972; GMA Network 1973-1975)
Twelve O'Clock High (ABS-CBN, 1972) - Host

Film
 Zoom, Zoom, Superman! as Superman debut role (1973)
 Si Popeye, atbp as Popeye (1973)
 Jack and Poy as Jack (1977)
 Ober Da Bakod The Movie as a Director (1994)
 Kasal, Kasali, Kasalo as Carlos (2006)
 Sakal, Sakali, Saklolo as Carlos (2007)
 Kimmy Dora: Kambal sa Kiyeme as Luisito Go Dong Hae (2009)
 Kimmy Dora and The Temple of Kiyeme as Luisito Go Dong Hae (2012)
 The Reunion as Papang (2012)
 Of All The Things as Father of Berns (2012)
 Shake, Rattle and Roll Fourteen: The Invasion as Father of Hank (Segment: Unwanted) (2012)
 The Bride and the Lover as Nestor Paredes (2013)
 Tuhog as Dr. Nuguid (2013)
 Kimmy Dora: Ang Kiyemeng Prequel as Luisito Go Dong Hae (2013)

TV director
Ober Da Bakod (GMA 7, 1992-1996)

Radio
Todo-Todo Walang Preno (DZMM-AM 630 kHz, 2004–2020)

Awards
Winner, Best Morning Show Hosts UKG Barkadas - 2012-2017 PMPC Star Awards For TV)
Winner, Best Male TV Host RSVP - 1992 PMPC Star Awards For TV

References

External links

Ariel Ureta on DZMM

1946 births
Living people
Filipino television journalists
Filipino radio journalists
Filipino male television actors
Filipino male comedians
People from Manila
ABS-CBN News and Current Affairs people
ABS-CBN personalities
GMA Network personalities
TV5 (Philippine TV network) personalities
University of Santo Tomas alumni